The 2003–04 ECHL season was the 16th season of the ECHL. This was the first season that the league would be known as only the ECHL instead of East Coast Hockey League after the absorption of the former West Coast Hockey League teams. The Brabham Cup regular season champions were the San Diego Gulls and the Kelly Cup playoff champions were the Idaho Steelheads.

League changes
This season brought a major change in the ECHL as the Board of Governors approved membership applications from the Anchorage Aces, the Bakersfield Condors, the Fresno Falcons, the Idaho Steelheads, the Las Vegas Wranglers, the Long Beach Ice Dogs and the San Diego Gulls from the recently defunct West Coast Hockey League. In a change reflective of the nationwide presence, the East Coast Hockey League changed its name to simply ECHL on May 19, 2003.

During the 2003 off-season, the Richmond Renegades, Arkansas RiverBlades, Jackson Bandits, Baton Rouge Kingfish, and Lexington Men O' War all ceased operations.

In addition to the former WCHL teams, the league also added two reactivated franchises in the Gwinnett Gladiators (formerly the Mobile Mysticks) and Texas Wildcatters (formerly the Huntington Blizzard).

All-Star Game
The ECHL All-Star Game was held at Carver Arena in Peoria, Illinois, and was hosted by the Peoria Rivermen.  The Eastern Conference All-Stars defeated the Western Conference All-Stars 7–6, with Peoria's Randy Rowe named Most Valuable Player.

Regular season

Final standings
Note: GP = Games played; W = Wins; L= Losses; OTL = Overtime or Shootout losses; GF = Goals for; GA = Goals against; Pts = PointsGreen shade = Clinched playoff spot; Blue shade = Clinched division; (z) = Clinched home-ice advantage

Eastern Conference

Western Conference

Scoring leaders
Note: GP = Games played; G = Goals; A = Assists; Pts = Points; PIM = Penalty Minutes

Leading goaltenders
Note: GP = Games played; Mins = Minutes played; W = Wins; L = Losses; T = Ties; GA = Goals allowed; SO = Shutouts; SV% = Save percentage; GAA = Goals against average

Kelly Cup playoffs

Bracket

Eastern Conference

1st round

Division Semifinals

Division finals

Conference finals

Kelly Cup finals

ECHL awards

See also
 ECHL All-Star Game
 Kelly Cup

References

External links
ECHL website

 
ECHL seasons
3